Black Creek is a stream in the municipalities of Tay Valley, Lanark County and Rideau Lakes, United Counties of Leeds and Grenville in Eastern Ontario, Canada. It flows from an unnamed lake in Rideau Lakes to the west shore of Big Rideau Lake in Tay Valley. Big Rideau Lake, on the Rideau Canal, flows via the Rideau River and Ottawa River to the Saint Lawrence River.

References

Sources

Rivers of Lanark County
Rivers of Leeds and Grenville United Counties